The Abdiel class were a class of six fast minelayers commissioned into the Royal Navy and active during the Second World War. They were also known as the Manxman class and as "mine-laying cruisers". These ships were armed with a wide variety of defensive weapons from  machine guns to the  main armament. They were also equipped with a wide array of radars, along with their normal complement of mines. They were easily mistaken for destroyers. Half the class was lost through enemy action during the Second World War; the others saw post-war service, and the last example was scrapped in the early 1970s.

Design
The Royal Navy ordered the first four ships in 1938, with a further two acquired as part of the War Emergency Programme. They were specifically designed for the rapid laying of minefields in enemy waters, close to harbours or sea lanes. As such they were required to be very fast and to possess sufficient anti-aircraft weaponry to defend themselves if discovered by enemy aircraft. A large load of up to 150 mines was required to be carried under cover, therefore a long, flushdecked hull with high freeboard was required. The mines were laid through doors in the sterns; the ships carried their own cranes for loading.

In size these ships were almost as long as a cruiser but laid out much like a large destroyer but the three straight funnels were an instant identifying feature. To put this into perspective, the contemporary s had  and a full load displacement of 12,980 tons, just short of four times that of the Abdiels.

The ships were initially to be armed much as destroyers, with three twin HA/LA Mark XIX mounts for QF  L/45 Mark XIV guns, with an elevation of 70°, in 'A', 'B' and 'X' positions, a quadruple "multiple pom-pom" mounting Mark VIII for the QF 2-pounder Mark VIII and a pair of quadruple 0.5-inch Vickers machine guns.

Wartime modifications involved adding a Type 279 radar at the masthead, a primitive metric wavelength air warning set, later replaced by a Type 286 then a Type 291, as they became available. A Type 285 radar was fitted to the rangefinder-director on the bridge, this was a metric set and could provide target ranging and bearing information. The centimetric Type 272, a target indication radar with plan position indicator (PPI), was fitted to the front leg of the foremast. Following the loss of Latona to air attack, the surviving ships were re-armed to remedy the shortcomings in anti-aircraft defence. Six single Oerlikon 20 mm cannons were initially added on P Mark III pedestal mountings, although these were later replaced by powered twin Mark V mountings. Ariadne and Apollo had two twin Mark IV "Hazemeyer" mountings for Bofors 40 mm guns sited amidships, replacing the pom-pom in 'Q' position, and these mounts carried their own Type 282 Radar for target ranging; Ariadne had an additional "Hazemeyer" mounting in 'B' position, replacing the 4-inch guns. In July 1945, Ariadne was refitted in the United States for far eastern service, when the Bofors mounts were replaced by American pattern models (Mark I) with off-mounting "simple tachymetric directors" (STD) fitted with Type 282 Radar and the Oerlikon mounts regunned with Bofors guns (this combination was known as the "Boffin").

Service
Although they were effective ships in their intended role, the combination of high internal capacity and exceptionally high speed meant that they were equally valuable as fast transports. As such, for much of their service, they were used for running supplies, particularly men and matériel, to isolated garrisons such as during the Siege of Tobruk and Malta in Operation Harpoon. With three funnels and the outline of a destroyer,  was camouflaged to appear like the Vichy French "contre torpilleurs" (large destroyers) . For this, a false bow was fitted, funnel caps were added, the mine chutes were plated over and a false deckline was painted on to camouflage the high flush-deck. Manxman received a similar disguise to pass for the Vichy contre torpilleur Léopard so she could pass Corsica and mine the approaches to Livorno.

On 25 October 1941, Latona was hit by a  bomb in the engine room, causing a serious fire that spread to the munitions she was carrying and resulting in her loss. Manxman took a torpedo in her engine room but survived, although repairs took two years.

Apollo, Ariadne and Manxman survived the war and saw post-war service, with their pennant numbers changed from "M" to "N". Apollo served as a despatch vessel and Manxman as a mine warfare support ship. In 1953, Manxman was used to depict a German raider in the re-made film of C. S. Forester's novel Brown on Resolution; for this her funnels were enlarged to alter her outline, dummy 6-inch barrels were fitted over her 4-inch guns, and her bow was painted to indicate 'torpedo damage'.

Ships

See also
 List of ship classes of the Second World War

References

Bibliography 
 
 
 Gardiner, Robert. Conway's All the World's Fighting Ships 1922-1946. Naval Institute Press, .
 Lenton, H.T. British and Empire Warships of the Second World War.Greenhill Books, .

External links

 
Mine warfare vessel classes
Ship classes of the Royal Navy